Apetahia was a genus of plants native to various islands of French Polynesia in the South Pacific now considered to be a synonym of Sclerotheca.

Apetahia longistigmata (F.Br.) E.Wimm - Marquesas
Apetahia margaretae (F.Br.) E.Wimm. in H.G.A.Engler  - Rapa Iti 
Apetahia raiateensis Baill. - Raiatea
Apetahia seigelii Florence - Marquesas

References

Lobelioideae
Flora of French Polynesia
Campanulaceae genera